Vizaga is a genus of moths of the family Nolidae. The genus was erected by Charles Swinhoe in 1901.

Species
 Vizaga cyanea (Snellen, 1881)
 Vizaga mirabilis (Bethune-Baker, 1906)

References

Chloephorinae